Boscov's Inc. is a family-owned department store with forty-nine locations in Pennsylvania, New York, New Jersey, Delaware, Maryland, Ohio, Connecticut, and Rhode Island. Twenty-six of these stores are located in Pennsylvania. 

Corporate headquarters are located in Exeter Township, Pennsylvania, near Reading. The company chairman is Jim Boscov, who took over after his uncle Albert Boscov retired.

History 
Solomon "Sol" Boscov was of Jewish descent. He emigrated from Russia to Reading, Pennsylvania, in 1911. He had $1.37 in cash on arrival in the United States. He worked as a traveling salesman with an initial $8 worth of merchandise. Because he spoke Yiddish, he was able to converse with people in Berks County who spoke Pennsylvania Dutch. Boscov's fortunes changed in 1914 when he opened the first Boscov's store at 9th and Pike streets in Reading. A Pennsylvania Historical Marker commemorating Solomon Boscov stands at the site of the original store.

Boscov's began expanding in the Reading suburbs during the 1960s, with the Boscov's West store in Sinking Spring opening in November 1962 and the Boscov's North store at the Reading Fairgrounds in Muhlenberg Township opening in August 1965. The Boscov's East store along 9th Street in Reading was destroyed by fire in February 1967 and was replaced by a new Boscov's East store in Exeter Township in November 1967. The Boscov's West store was destroyed by fire in November 1967 and reopened in November 1968.

By 1968, Boscov's had five stores, 2,200 workers, and annual sales exceeding $50 million. Solomon Boscov retired and was succeeded by his son Albert "Albie" Boscov as head of the company in 1960. The first Boscov's location outside of Berks County opened at the Lebanon Valley Mall in Lebanon, Pennsylvania, in August 1972. Boscov's bought Fowler, Dick and Walker, the Boston Store in 1980. One of Wilkes-Barre's last remaining downtown department stores, it was also Boscov's first multi-story store.

Boscov's opened its first location outside of Pennsylvania at the Dover Mall in Dover, Delaware, in August 1982. Boscov's first entered the Philadelphia market in the late 1980s by opening Ports of the World outlet stores. These stores would later be re-branded as Boscov's sometime in the mid-1990s.

In 1983, Boscov's leased the Fowler's department store building and opened the next year in downtown Binghamton, New York.

In August 2002, Boscov's opened a store at the Berkshire Mall in Wyomissing, replacing a Strawbridge's store. As a result, the Boscov's West store in Sinking Spring closed.

In 2006, Albert Boscov, the son of Solomon Boscov, retired and his nephew Kenneth Lakin became chairman and chief executive. Lakin led an aggressive expansion of the chain, opening 10 new stores by 2008. Boscov's acquired these locations from Federated Department Stores following the merger with The May Department Stores Company. The new stores did not perform as expected. In August 2008, just prior to the 2008 economic downturn Boscov's filed for Chapter 11 bankruptcy. Albert Boscov came out of retirement and regained control of the company. As part of the bankruptcy, 10 stores were closed. The company emerged from bankruptcy in September 2009.

Albert Boscov died from pancreatic cancer on February 10, 2017, at the age of eighty-seven. The chain is now headed by his nephew, Jim Boscov.

Boscov's continuing success makes it regarded as an "outlier" in a retail market where many department store chains are failing and closing stores. Boscov's saw record sales of $1.2 billion in 2017. Since 2009, the chain continues to expand and opened its 47th store in Milford, Connecticut, in October 2018. Boscov's plans to continue to open one store per year and has invested in older stores by renovating them. Boscov's announced plans to move into the Providence Place mall in Providence, Rhode Island, in 2019, following the departure of Nordstrom, which terminated the lease on the space. The store opened on September 26, 2019.

In 2020, Boscov's announced plans to open at Eastwood Mall in Niles, Ohio, in the former Sears space. The store opened on October 7, 2021, a year late due to the COVID-19 pandemic. In 2023, Boscov's announced that a store will open at the Meadowbrook Mall in Bridgeport, West Virginia, in the later part of the year; this will be Boscov's 50th store and first location in the state.

Civic affairs and charitable giving
During the 1970s, Boscov's launched its "Friends Helping Friends" program, an annual fundraising event which has raised roughly a million dollars each year for non-profit organizations.

Jazz festival 
Boscov's sponsors the annual "Boscov's Berks Jazz Fest" which draws 35,000 to 40,000 people to the Reading area.

Thanksgiving Day Parade 
When Gimbels went out of business in 1986, WPVI-TV and Boscov's took over the sponsorship of the Philadelphia Thanksgiving Day Parade. Boscov's remained a co-sponsor until 2007.

In popular culture

The Boscov’s in Camp Hill, Pennsylvania was used to represent the fictional department store Illustra in the 1987 film  Mannequin.

Boscov's is mentioned in the Season 3 episode Kimmy Steps on a Crack! of the Netflix comedy series Unbreakable Kimmy Schmidt.

It is also mentioned in NBC’s The Office, Season 5, Episode 25, “Casual Friday”.

Gallery

References

External links

 Official website

Privately held companies based in Pennsylvania
Economy of the Northeastern United States
Department stores of the United States
Companies that filed for Chapter 11 bankruptcy in 2008
American companies established in 1914
Companies based in Reading, Pennsylvania
1914 establishments in Pennsylvania
Clothing retailers of the United States
Retail companies established in 1914
Family-owned companies of the United States